Allocasuarina torulosa, the rose she-oak or forest oak, is a tree which grows in sub-rainforest (just outside the main forest area) of Queensland and New South Wales, Australia. There, it is typically found on coastal footslopes, hills, and plains. Originally described as Casuarina torulosa by William Aiton, it was moved to its current genus in 1982 by Australian botanist Lawrie Johnson. It is the type species of the genus Allocasuarina.

A. torulosa is an evergreen tree that typically reaches 12-18 metres (40-60 feet) tall and 4.5-7.5 metres (15-25 feet) wide. It appears to have needle-like leaves, but these are actually twigs; the real leaves are actually in the joint of the needles and appear in whorls of four. These needles have a weeping, pendulous appearance, and turn reddish-brown in the winter. The tree produces warty cones 15-33 millimeters long and 15-15 millimeters in diameter. Its bark is thick and corky.

The timber is reddish pink to brown. It is prized by woodworkers and woodturners as a rare and exotic timber, often used in wood turnings, knife handles and other specialist items. The rose she-oak has the largest contraction along the grain (12%) of any Australian wood and needs to be dried carefully to get full value as a useful timber.

It grows from seed, and cut or broken trees will often regenerate from the trunk.

This is a low-maintenance tree that will grow in a variety of soils and tolerate light frosts. In the US, it is suitable for USDA hardiness zones 8–11. It may be susceptible to Armillaria and Phytophthora.

The seeds have been found to be a food source for the Yellow-tailed black cockatoo.

References

External links
 
  Occurrence data for Allocasuarina torulosa from The Australasian Virtual Herbarium

torulosa
Flora of New South Wales
Flora of Queensland
Trees of Australia
Fagales of Australia
Drought-tolerant trees